Nur al-Din al-Sabuni also written as Nuraddin as-Sabuni, was a 12th century theologian within the Maturidite school of Sunni Islam, and author of Al-Bidayah min al-Kifayah fi al-Hidayah fi Usul al-Din, a summary of Islamic creed (aqida or kalam) of his more comprehensive work al-Kifayah.

Name 
Ahmad b. Mahmud b. Abi Bakr al-Sabuni al-Bukhari, known as Nur al-Din Abu Muhammad.

Birth and Death 
He was born in Bukhara probably at the beginning of sixth / twelfth century, and died in the same city on 16 Safar 580 / May 30, 1184, and was buried in the Graveyard of the Seven Judges.

Life 
There is not much information about his life. He seems to have belonged to a respected family in Bukhara, where he spent much of his life. He received his education in the same city and became a leading defender of the Maturidite theology of his time. He had made a trip to Mecca to perform hajj and on his way to Mecca, he visited Khurasan and Iraq and had discussions with the scholars of these regions.

He also had lively discussions with Fakhr al-Din al-Razi, a leading representative of Ash'arite theology of his time. According to al-Razi's report, at the end of these discussions, Sabuni said that all his knowledge of kalam was based on the work of Abu al-Mu'in al-Nasafi; he also admitted to his own weakness in the science but said he was too old to start again.

Books 

Al-Sabuni wrote a number of works, some of which are still in manuscript. In his al-Muntaqa min 'ismat al-Anbiya', he summarizes the work of Muhammad b. Yahya al-Bashaghiri called Kashf al-Ghawamid fi Ahwal al-Anbiya' or 'Ismat al-Anbiya'. It starts by saying God sending a prophet is the result of His wise purpose, that prophets must be human, and that some of them are superior to others. Then after discussing their number and their infallibility, he goes on to discuss each individual prophet, starting with Adam and ending with the last prophet Muhammad.

His al-Kifaya fi al-Hidaya is a longer version of his al-Bidaya fi Usul al-Din. As he states in the introduction of the latter work, some of his friends found al-Kifaya too long and asked him to summarize it, and consequently he wrote al-Bidaya. Through these works, al-Sabuni closely follows and defends the views of al-Maturidi. Al-Bidaya begins with a discussion of the sources of knowledge. Then, al-Sabuni tries to establish first the createdness (huduth) of the world, then the existence of its Creator. This is followed by a discussion of God's attributes. Al-Sabuni also deals with the issues that are controversial between the Ash'arites and the Maturidites, such as the attribute of creating (takwin) and supports the position of al-Maturidi. The discussions of prophecy, degree, predetermination and human actions are followed by other traditional theoretical issues.

See also 
 Abu Hanifa
 Abu Mansur al-Maturidi
 Abu al-Yusr al-Bazdawi
 Abu al-Mu'in al-Nasafi
 List of Ash'aris and Maturidis
 List of Muslim theologians

References 

 

Hanafis
Maturidis
12th-century Muslim theologians
Sunni imams
Sunni Muslim scholars of Islam
Uzbekistani Muslims
1184 deaths